"The Gold Diggers' Song (We're in the Money)" is a song from the 1933 Warner Bros. film Gold Diggers of 1933, sung in the opening sequence by Ginger Rogers and chorus.  The entire song is never performed in the 1933 movie, though it introduces the film in the opening scene (wherein the performance is busted up by the police).  Later in the movie, the tune is heard off stage in rehearsal as the director continues a discussion on camera about other matters.
 
The lyrics were written by Al Dubin and the music by Harry Warren. It became a standard with a well-known melody. It is one of the songs of the Broadway theatre's musical 42nd Street (musical).

Lyrics

The song's lyrics reflect a positive financial turnaround and a fantasized end to the Great Depression, which in the U.S. began to turn around in early 1933 but wouldn't actually end until the late 1930s:

(Opening verse)
We're in the money!
We're in the money!
We've got a lot of what it takes to get along!
We're in the money!
The skies are sunny!
Ol' Man Depression, you are through, you done us wrong!
We never see a headline 'bout a bread line today,
And when we see the landlord,
We can look that guy right in the eye!
We're in the money!
Come on, my honey!
Let's spend it, lend it, send it rolling along!

Early versions
Early popular recordings of this song were performed by Ted Lewis & His Band and by Hal Kemp & His Orchestra. Dick Powell, who does not sing a note of "The Golddigger's Song" in the motion picture, recorded a version that also sold well. Other 1933 versions were by The Dorsey Brothers (vocal by The Boswell Sisters), and Leo Reisman and His Orchestra (vocal by Fred Astaire).

Other recordings
Bing Crosby recorded the song in 1954 for use on his radio show and it was subsequently included in the box set The Bing Crosby CBS Radio Recordings (1954–56) issued by Mosaic Records (catalog MD7-245) in 2009. 
Rosemary Clooney included the song in her album Dedicated to Nelson (1996).
Mihoko Tokoro performs a version of this song in Japanese for the 1996 film My Fellow Americans. This version also appears on the film's soundtrack album.
American swing revivalists the Cherry Poppin' Daddies recorded a version for their 2016 covers album The Boop-A-Doo.

In other Warner Bros. productions
The song was used again in three other Warner Bros. productions: as the theme song of the 1933 Merrie Melodies cartoon We're in the Money; and as the theme and source music two years later in the 1935 film, We're in the Money. It also appears in other cartoons for scenes where a character has gained a lot of money or thinks that he's about to. The song also appears in the 1962 The Chapman Report, played by a calliope at an amusement park; in the 1967 Bonnie and Clyde, starring Warren Beatty and Faye Dunaway (the film is set in the Great Depression, they are in a theatre where the original Gold Diggers movie is showing, Bonnie is enjoying the song while Clyde is furiously reprimanding the getaway driver from a bank robbery gone bad); and as the car horn sound on Rodney Dangerfield's Rolls-Royce in the 1982 Caddyshack.

Media
On the very first Simpsons episode, "Simpsons Roasting on an Open Fire", Bart and Barney sing the first three lines of the song.

In the Simpsons episode "HOMR", the first two lines of the song are sung by a chorus in Homer's head during a scene when he thinks that he'll get rich by investing in the stock market.

This song is also included in the Simpsons episode "Bart Stops to Smell the Roosevelts". The song played at the end of the auction.

The song was included in the stage adaptation of 42nd Street, along with other songs by Dubin & Warren, who wrote the songs for the original movie version.

The song is featured in the game Dance on Broadway.

An orchestral version of the song is used to denote a strong day on Wall Street in the podcast Marketplace.

In the AMC show, Better Call Saul, the lawyer Saul Goodman whistles the tune to this song in Season 5, Episode 6 (Wexler v. Goodman).

The song was used as the theme tune by Lotto during 1988.

See also
The Man Who Broke the Bank at Monte Carlo (song)

References

1933 songs
Songs with music by Harry Warren
Songs with lyrics by Al Dubin
Songs written for films
Great Depression songs